Rowhedge Ironworks was a shipyard situated on the River Colne, and in the village of Rowhedge, in the English county of Essex. It existed from 1904 to 1964, and built a number of coastal vessels, including VIC type Clyde puffers and ferries for the Hythe Ferry in Southampton. The yard also specialised in building small craft for overseas buyers, often in kit form for assembly abroad, including vessels for use on Lake Titicaca and the River Nile.

The site of the yard is now occupied by a riverside housing development.

Vessels built 

In total, the Rowhedge Ironworks built some 900 vessels, including:
 
  (1936)
  (1938)
 Guide of Dunkirk (1940)
  (1941)
 Empire Lad (1941)
 Empire Homestead (1942)
 Empire Boxer (1943)
 VIC 76 (1945)
 VIC 77 (1945)
 VIC 78 (1945)
  (1946)
  (1956)

References

External links 
 

Defunct shipbuilding companies of England
Essex